Yves Morin,  (born November 28, 1929) is a Canadian cardiologist, physician, scientist, and former Senator.

Born in Quebec City, Quebec, he received a Bachelor of Arts degree in 1948 and a Doctor of Medicine degree in 1953 from the Université Laval.

He was Dean of the Faculty of Medicine at Université Laval.

In 2001, he was appointed to the Senate of Canada representing the senatorial division of Lauzon, Quebec. A Liberal, he served until his mandatory retirement on his 75th birthday in 2004.

In 1990, he was made an Officer of the Order of Canada for having "a major influence on the training of a generation of doctors". In 1995, he was made an Officer of the National Order of Quebec.

References

External links

Cititation at the official National Order of Quebec website 

1929 births
Canadian senators from Quebec
Canadian university and college faculty deans
Canadian cardiologists
French Quebecers
Liberal Party of Canada senators
Living people
Officers of the National Order of Quebec
Officers of the Order of Canada
Politicians from Quebec City
Université Laval alumni
21st-century Canadian politicians
Academic staff of Université Laval